DesignCrowd is an online crowdsourcing platform founded in 2007. Its main product appears to be online software called BrandCrowd which enables users to create design assets, such as logos and websites.

History 
DesignCrowd was launched January 2008. According to the Australian Financial Review, "Alec Lynch is recognised as a founder of the design crowdsourcing concept". DesignCrowd was started in Sydney, Australia.

The company has received significant funding from Starfish Ventures. On 20 December 2011, DesignCrowd acquired Brandstack, a stock logo template marketplace where users are able to buy and sell logo templates and domains. Following the acquisition, Brandstack's name was changed to "BrandCrowd." In 2014, DesignCrowd announced that it had acquired community design contest website Worth1000 for an undisclosed amount. The company expanded to Philippines in 2014. In 2015 AirTree Ventures invested $6 million in DesignCrowd's crowdsourcing platform.

Investors behind DesignCrowd have included Perennial Value Management, Alium Capital, Ellerston Capital, Regal Funds Management and CVC.

Awards and achievements 
 Alec Lynch named Ernst & Young's Entrepreneur of the Year Award winner, 2014 (Eastern Region - Category: Emerging)
 DesignCrowd ranked #22 in Deloitte's TechFast50 2014 rankings

References

External links 
 Company website

Freelance marketplace websites
Online marketplaces of Australia
Technology companies established in 2008
Crowdsourcing